This is the results breakdown of the local elections held in the Community of Madrid on 3 April 1979. The following tables show detailed results in the autonomous community's most populous municipalities, sorted alphabetically.

Overall

City control
The following table lists party control in the most populous municipalities, including provincial capitals (shown in bold).

Municipalities

Alcalá de Henares
Population: 110,102

Alcobendas
Population: 55,869

Alcorcón
Population: 119,300

Coslada
Population: 37,268

Fuenlabrada
Population: 28,353

Getafe
Population: 124,601

Leganés
Population: 151,235

Madrid

Population: 3,355,720

Móstoles
Population: 101,266

Parla
Population: 35,259

Torrejón de Ardoz
Population: 54,702

References

Madrid
1979